Pernod Ricard is a French company best known for its anise-flavoured pastis apéritifs Pernod Anise and Ricard Pastis (often referred to simply as Pernod or Ricard).  The world’s second-largest wine and spirits seller, it also produces several other types of pastis.

History
After the banning of absinthe, Pernod Ricard was created from the Pernod Fils company, which had produced absinthe. Pernod Ricard owned the distilled beverage division of the former corporation Seagram (including brands like Chivas Regal) until 2006, along with many other holdings. In 2005, the company acquired a British-based competitor, Allied Domecq PLC.

In 2008, Pernod Ricard announced its acquisition of Swedish-based V&S Group, which produces Absolut Vodka. In 2013, Pernod Ricard joined leading alcohol producers as part of a producers' commitments to reducing harmful drinking.

In December 2018,  Elliott Management Corporation purchased a 2.5% stake in Pernod Ricard. In December 2022, Pernot Ricard announced plans to open a US$250 million carbon-neutral whiskey distillery in Marion County, Kentucky in 2025.

According to the Anti-Corrida Alliance, Pernod Ricard was the major funder of bullfighting in France, financing bullfighting clubs and sponsoring corridas despite the opposition of a majority of French citizens to blood sports. In 2020, Pernod Ricard ended the association with bullfighting clubs.

Pernod

1797 – , a Swiss distiller, opens his first absinthe distillery in Switzerland.
1805 – Maison Pernod Fils (simply known as Pernod Fils) is founded in Pontarlier, Franche-Comté, eastern France, by Henri-Louis Pernod and begins production of the anise-flavored spirit known as absinthe.
1850 – Henri-Louis Pernod dies.
1871 – Distillerie Hémard is founded near Paris.
1872 – Société Pernod Père & Fils opens in Avignon.
1915 – Production and consumption of absinthe is prohibited in France.
1926 – All 3 distilleries merge to form Les Établissements Pernod.
1951 – Pastis 51 is launched.
1965 – Takeover of Distillerie Rousseau, Laurens et Moureaux, producer of Suze liquor since 1889.

Ricard
1932 – Ricard, which soon becomes France's favorite long drink, is founded in Marseille by Paul Ricard.
1940 – Production of pastis is prohibited by the Vichy regime.
1944 – Production of pastis becomes legal again.
1968 – Paul Ricard retires; his son Patrick becomes CEO in 1978.

Pernod Ricard

1975 – Old rivals Pernod and Ricard merge to form Pernod Ricard S.A..
1988 – Pernod Ricard acquires Irish Distillers makers of Jameson Irish whiskeys.
1989 – Pernod Ricard acquires Orlando Wyndham makers of Jacob's Creek.
1993 – Pernod Ricard works with Cuban companies to create Havana Club
1998 – Pernod Ricard acquires the Yerevan Brandy Company.
2001 – Pernod Ricard purchases 38% of Seagram's Wines and Spirits business including Chivas Brothers Ltd makers of Chivas Regal and owner of 13 Scotch malt distilleries, 1 grain distillery and 2 gin distilleries.
2005 – Pernod Ricard purchases Allied Domecq, makers of Ballantine's.
2008 – Pernod Ricard purchases V&S Group, including the Absolut Vodka brand, from the Swedish government.
2022 - Pernod Ricard acquired the French ready-to-serve cocktail brand, Cockorico.

Subsidiaries
Pernod Ricard Armenia – Armenian subsidiary and owner of Yerevan Brandy Company
Pernod Ricard Hellas – subsidiary in Greece
Pernod Ricard India – Indian subsidiary
Pernod Ricard Rouss – subsidiary in the Russian Federation
Pernod Ricard Winemakers – owner of Jacob's Creek, Brancott Estate, Campo Viejo, Ysios, Tarsus, Aura, Azpilicueta, and Siglo
Chivas Brothers Ltd – whisky and gin branch of Pernod Ricard, makers of Chivas Regal and Royal Salute 
Corby Distilleries – Canadian subsidiary; owner of Wiser's whisky, Lamb's rum; Hiram Walker & Sons Limited is majority shareholder of Corby and itself unit of Pernod Ricard
Irish Distillers – Irish subsidiary and makers of Jameson Irish Whiskey, Powers, Redbreast and Midleton Very Rare

Brands
 Whisky

 Vodkas

 Other

 Wine and Champagne

Pernod Ricard previously owned the non-alcoholic chocolate beverage Yoo-hoo, which was acquired from a group of private investors in 1989. Pernod Ricard also previously owned the carbonated citrus drink Orangina. Both brands were sold in 2001 to Cadbury Schweppes.

References

External links

 
Distilleries in France
French brands
Holding companies of France
Multinational companies headquartered in France
Absinthe
Anise liqueurs and spirits
French companies established in 1975
Food and drink companies established in 1975
Holding companies established in 1975
CAC 40
Companies in the Euro Stoxx 50
Companies listed on Euronext Paris